Anthony Paul Chickillo (born July 8, 1960) is a former American football defensive lineman who played three seasons in the National Football League with the San Diego Chargers and New York Jets. He was drafted by the Tampa Bay Buccaneers in the fifth round of the 1983 NFL Draft. He played college football at the University of Miami and attended Southwest Miami High School in Miami, Florida. Chickillo was also a member of the Tampa Bay Storm, Miami Hooters and New Jersey Gladiators of the Arena Football League. He is the son of NFL player Nick Chickillo and the father of NFL linebacker Anthony Chickillo.

References

External links
Just Sports Stats

Living people
1960 births
Players of American football from Miami
American football defensive tackles
Miami Hurricanes football players
San Diego Chargers players
New York Jets players
Tampa Bay Storm players
Miami Hooters players
New Jersey Gladiators players
Southwest Miami Senior High School alumni